Ernest Okonkwo (born 1936) was a Nigerian sport commentator and journalist who worked at Radio Nigeria. He died on 7 August 1990.

References 

Nigerian journalists
1990 deaths
1936 births